Spyros Vlachos (born 19 January 1996) is a Greek professional footballer who plays as a centre-back for Super League 2 club Athens Kallithea.

References

1996 births
Living people
Gamma Ethniki players
Football League (Greece) players
Super League Greece 2 players
Fostiras F.C. players
A.E. Sparta P.A.E. players
Apollon Pontou FC players
A.E. Karaiskakis F.C. players
Association football defenders
Footballers from Athens
Greek footballers